Thomas Villiers may refer to:
 Thomas Villiers, 1st Earl of Clarendon (1709–1786), British peer, Postmaster General and Chancellor of the Duchy of Lancaster
 Thomas Villiers, 2nd Earl of Clarendon (1753–1824), British peer and Member of Parliament
 Thomas Hyde Villiers (1801–1832), British politician 
 Thomas Villiers Lister (1832-1902), British diplomat
 Thomas Lister Villiers (1869–1959), British planter in Ceylon

See also
 Tommy Villiers, one half of piri & tommy